Mount Nittany Medical Center (MNMC) is a hospital in State College, Pennsylvania.  It is an acute-care facility offering emergency, medical, surgical, diagnostic and community services.  The hospital is located adjacent to the Pennsylvania State University main campus near Beaver Stadium. MNMC employees around 2,400 healthcare professionals and support staff, with 60 specialties and subspecialties.  The hospital includes a rooftop helipad used by Life Flight.

History

Early years
The Bellefonte Hospital was founded in 1902 in Bellefonte, Pennsylvania. In 1972, a new unit was opened at the current location in State College; both units were then known as parts of the Centre Community Hospital. It was first called Mountain View hospital before it became Centre Community Hospital. The original location in Bellefonte would close in 1978.

Mount Nittany Medical Center
In 2003, the name was changed to Mount Nittany Medical Center.  The facility has gone through several renovations and expansions.  Some of the notable recent expansions include the addition of a new 52,000 square foot state-of-the-art east wing in 2010 and a brand new comprehensive Cancer Center in 2012.  A new 26,000 square foot cardiovascular pavilion opened in 2019 and includes updated cardiac catheterization lab and electrophysiology lab spaces, complete with new imaging and monitoring technology.

Cancer research
The hospital is a founding member of the Penn State Hershey Cancer Institute (PSHCI).

References

External links
 

Hospital buildings completed in 1972
State College, Pennsylvania
Hospitals established in 1902
Buildings and structures in Centre County, Pennsylvania
Hospitals in Pennsylvania